Allahabad district, officially known as Prayagraj district, is the most populous district of Uttar Pradesh state of India. The district headquarters is Allahabad which was renamed Prayagraj at the same time as the district was renamed. The District is divided into blocks within tehsils. As of 2011, there are 20 blocks in eight tehsils. The Allahabad division includes the districts of Pratapgarh, Fatehpur, Kaushambi and Allahabad, with some western parts that had previously part of Allahabad District becoming part of the new Kaushambi District. The administrative divisions are Phulpur, Koraon, Meja, Sadar, Soraon, Handia, Bara, Shringverpur and Karchana.

The three rivers of India - Ganges, Yamuna and the mythical river of Sarasvati - meet at a point in the district, known as Sangam, considered holy by Hindus. Allahabad was once the capital of United Province before independence. Allahabad is one of the largest educational hubs.

Demographics

According to the 2011 census of India the district has a population of 5,954,391. This gives it a ranking of 13th in India (out of a total of 640). As of 2011 it is the most populous district of Uttar Pradesh (out of 71). Its population growth rate over the decade 2001-2011 was 20.74%.

The district has a sex ratio of 902 females for every 1000 males, and a literacy rate of 74.41%, highest in the region and close to the all-India average of 74%. Scheduled Castes made up 22.00% of the population.

Languages

At the time of the 2011 Census of India, 94.91% of the population in the district spoke Hindi (or a variant of Hindi), 2.69% Urdu and 1.86% Awadhi as their first language.

People in the district speak Awadhi, a language in the Hindi continuum spoken by over 4 million people, mainly in the Awadh region; and Bagheli, which has a lexical similarity of 72-91% with Hindi and is spoken by about 3 million people in Bagelkhand.<re></ref>

Religion

Hinduism is majority religion in the district with 85.69% followers. Islam is second most popular religion in district of Allahabad with approximately 13.38% following it. Around 0.93% stated 'Other Religion', approximately 0.90% stated 'No Particular Religion'.

The Prayag Kumbh Mela is a major Hindu event. Allahabad has a Triveni Sangam. 
Akshayavat is a sacred fig tree. There is a Roman Catholic Diocese of Allahabad.

References

External links
 

 
Districts of Uttar Pradesh